Didier Njewel (born 7 September 1983) is a Cameroonian football midfielder currently playing club football for Shanghai East Asia.

References

1983 births
Living people
Cameroonian footballers
Cameroonian expatriate footballers
Expatriate footballers in China
Cameroonian expatriate sportspeople in China
Chinese Super League players
China League One players
Pudong Zobon players
Shanghai Port F.C. players
Association football forwards